Honora subsciurella is a species of snout moth in the genus Honora. It was described by Émile Louis Ragonot in 1887 and is found in North America, including Colorado and California.

References

Moths described in 1887
Phycitinae